This is a list of area codes in the province of Quebec:

 514, overlaid with 438, and as of October 2022, area code 263 : Greater Montreal
 418, overlaid with 581 and 367 : Eastern Quebec (Bas-Saint-Laurent, Capitale-Nationale, Chaudière-Appalaches, Côte-Nord, Gaspésie–Îles-de-la-Madeleine and Saguenay–Lac-Saint-Jean)
  450, overlaid with 579, and as of October 2022, area code  354 : Off-island suburbs of Montreal (western parts of Estrie, Laval, Lanaudière, Basses-Laurentides and Montérégie)
  819, overlaid with  873, and as of October 2022, area code 468 : Western and Northern Quebec (including Abitibi-Témiscamingue, Mauricie, Nord-du-Québec, Outaouais and Hautes-Laurentides), and South-Eastern Quebec (Centre-du-Québec and most of Estrie)

613: Saint Regis, Quebec; this is otherwise an eastern Ontario area code.

References

See also 

 Telephone numbers in Canada
 Canadian Numbering Administration Consortium

Quebec
Area codes
Area codes